Thomas William Kelly (known throughout his playing career as Bill or Billy (22 November 1919 – 1970)) was an English footballer who made 157 appearances in the Football League for Darlington either side of the Second World War. He played at centre half, right half or right back. After leaving Darlington, he was on the books of York City, without representing that club in league competition, and also played for non-league club Horden Colliery Welfare.

References

1919 births
1970 deaths
Footballers from Darlington
Association football defenders
Darlington F.C. players
York City F.C. players
Darlington Town F.C. players
English Football League players
Date of death missing
Place of death missing
English footballers